Cally R. Forrest (born May 22, 1977) is an American politician. He is a member of the South Carolina House of Representatives from the 39th District, serving since 2016. He is a member of the Republican party.

References

Living people
1977 births
Republican Party members of the South Carolina House of Representatives
21st-century American politicians